Events in the year 1791 in Norway.

Incumbents
Monarch: Christian VII

Events
Jens Holmboe starts organized settling to the uninhabited Målselvdalen, from the Gudbrand Valley and Østerdalen.

Arts and literature

Births

11 July - Jonas Schanche Kielland, consul and politician (d.1852)
14 August - Frederik Holst, medical doctor (d.1871).
15 November - Peder Jensen Fauchald, politician (d.1856)
16 November - Olaf Rye, military officer (d.1849)

Full date unknown
Gjest Baardsen, outlaw, jail-breaker, non-fiction writer, songwriter and memoirist (died 1849).
Hans Glad Bloch, politician (d.1865)
Mikkel Johannesen Borge, politician
Martin Halvorsen Vee, politician
Arnt Arntsen Wang, politician

Deaths
25 December  – Claus Fasting, playwright, literary critic, editor and civil servant (born 1746)

See also

References